Cosijn is a Dutch surname. Notable people with the surname include:

 Lies Cosijn (1931–2016), Dutch ceramist
 P. J. Cosijn (1840–1899), Dutch scholar of Anglo-Saxon literature

Dutch-language surnames